A. Stephen Morse (born June 18, 1939) is the Dudley Professor of distributed control and adaptive control in electrical engineering at Yale University.

Early life and education 
Morse was born in Mt. Vernon, New York. He received his B.S. from Cornell University, his M.S. from the University of Arizona, and his Ph.D. from Purdue University.

Awards
Morse received the IEEE Control Systems Award and the Richard E. Bellman Control Heritage Award in 1999 and 2013, respectively. Morse was elected a member of the National Academy of Engineering in 2002 for contributions to geometric control theory, adaptive control, and the stability of hybrid systems.

See also 
List of members of the National Academy of Engineering (Electronics)

References

Control theorists
1939 births
Living people
Fellow Members of the IEEE
Cornell University College of Engineering alumni
Richard E. Bellman Control Heritage Award recipients
Members of the United States National Academy of Engineering
Fellows of the Society for Industrial and Applied Mathematics
University of Arizona alumni
Purdue University alumni
Yale School of Engineering & Applied Science faculty
People from Mount Vernon, New York